Ekonomia (meaning Economy in English) is a newspaper published in Tirana, Albania.

Profile
Ekonomia was established in 1998. The publisher of the paper is the Albanian Economic Development Agency. The daily is headquartered in Tirana and is published in tabloid format six times a week. The last page of the paper is published in English.

See also
 List of newspapers in Albania

References

1998 establishments in Albania
Albanian-language newspapers
Business newspapers
Newspapers published in Albania
Mass media in Tirana
Publications established in 1998